Miraflores Central Park, also known as Miraflores Park, is a public park located in Miraflores, Lima, Peru. It is divided into two parks: John F. Kennedy Park and 7 June Park. The former gives the entire park complex its popular name, Kennedy Park.

The park is known for its large presence of street cats, and is commonly used for events such as book fairs and marathons, as well as Fiestas Patrias celebrations such as the Corso Wong, and political and social protests.

History
The area that houses the park today saw conflict during the battle of Lima during the War of the Pacific. The park's official name was established in 1900 and has remained since.

The area did not see much development until the construction of the Iglesia Matriz Virgen Milagrosa church in the 1940s, after which it expanded around its area, eventually being divided into two parks: the John F. Kennedy Park, named after U.S. President John F. Kennedy for his role in the Alliance for Progress, and the 7 June Park, named after the Battle of Arica of the War of the Pacific.

In the 1990s, the area was reportedly plagued by rats, which caused local residents to start leaving their cats in the park, with the latter eventually replacing the former in large numbers. The presence of cats today serve as a tourist attraction.

A bust of Kennedy is featured in the homonymous park, having been inaugurated on November 21, 2003, by then mayor of Miraflores Fernando Andrade Carmona on the occasion of twinning Miraflores with Pensacola, Florida. Also featured in the park is an amphitheatre of singer Chabuca Granda.

Between 2015 and 2016, during the second administration of mayor of Miraflores Jorge Muñoz Wells, a 4-story underground parking lot was built, inaugurated on December 15, 2016, thus eliminating parking lots on adjoining avenues and widening the sidewalks.

In 2019, the park was the start and finish line of a marathon that took place as part of the larger Pan American Games for both men and women.

Gallery

See also
List of tourist attractions in Lima
Calle de las Pizzas, located across the street

References

Parks in Peru
Memorials to John F. Kennedy
War of the Pacific